The Year of the Five Emperors was AD 193, in which five men claimed the title of Roman emperor: Pertinax, Didius Julianus, Pescennius Niger, Clodius Albinus, and Septimius Severus. This year started a period of civil war when multiple rulers vied for the chance to become emperor.

The political unrest began with the murder of Emperor Commodus on New Year's Eve 192. Once Commodus was assassinated, Pertinax was named emperor, but immediately aroused opposition in the Praetorian Guard when he attempted to initiate reforms. They then plotted his assassination, and Pertinax was killed while trying to reason with the mutineers. He had only been emperor for three months. Didius Julianus, who purchased the title from the Praetorian Guard, succeeded Pertinax, but was ousted by Septimius Severus and executed on June 1. Severus was declared Caesar by the Senate, but Pescennius Niger was hostile when he declared himself emperor. This started the civil war between Niger and Severus; both gathered troops and fought throughout the territory of the empire.  Due to this war, Severus allowed Clodius Albinus, whom he suspected of being a threat, to be co-Caesar so that Severus did not have to preoccupy himself with imperial governance. This move allowed him to concentrate on waging the war against Niger. Most historians count Severus and Albinus as two emperors, though they ruled simultaneously.  The Severan dynasty was created out of the chaos of AD 193.

History

Fall of Commodus
Commodus' sanity began to unravel when a close associate, Cleander, was assassinated, which put Commodus in fear for his life. This triggered a series of summary executions of members of the aristocracy. He began removing himself from his identity as ruler ideologically by resuming his birth name instead of keeping the names that his father gave him when he succeeded to imperial rule. His behavior decayed further as he became more paranoid. He carried out a particularly large massacre in Rome during New Year's Eve AD 192, so that he could become the sole consul. Three nobles, Eclectus, Marcia, and Laetus, fearing that they would be targeted, had Commodus strangled before he could do so. The assassins then named Pertinax the new Caesar.

The identity of the person who planned the murder of Commodus is still a debated topic. Some sources name Pertinax as the mastermind of the assassination because he obtained imperial rule once Commodus was killed.  However, the accusations against Pertinax appear to have come from his enemies, an effort to damage his reputation; in reality, these accusers appear not to have known who masterminded the assassination.

Pertinax

Pertinax gained his political clout by moving his way up the military ranks.  He was proconsul of Africa, making him the first of several emperors who began their political careers in Africa. Since most of the nobles had been murdered in the New Year's Eve massacre, Pertinax was one of the few high-ranking officials left to become the new emperor.  Pertinax faced early difficulties due to the empire's crumbling financial situation and the accusations that he was complicit in the assassination of Commodus. He may also have been accused of the murder of Cleander, Commodus' associate, whose murder had triggered Commodus' paranoia.

Pertinax was a great contrast to Commodus. He was disciplined, but lost the favor of the Praetorian Guard when he refused to pay their donativum and began revoking privileges given to them by Commodus. When confronted by the Praetorian Guard he was unable to negotiate a peace, and was subsequently killed by the Guard.

Following the death of Pertinax, the Praetorian Guard proceeded to auction off the Purple to the highest bidder.

Didius Julianus
Didius Julianus gained power as proconsul of Africa, succeeding Pertinax in that position. Julianus was not just given the position of emperor after Pertinax's death. He had competition in Pertinax's father-in-law, Sulpicianus. The only way that Julianus gained the throne was by outbidding Sulpicianus for the amount he would pay the troops, thus gaining the favour of the Praetorian Guard. Julianus was originally accused of being Pertinax's murderer. Two public figures used the public's fear to take advantage of this crisis: Pescennius Niger, the governor of Syria, and Septimius Severus. Twelve days after Pertinax's murder, Severus declared himself emperor in place of Julianus. The mobs, who regarded Julianus unfavorably, called on Pescennius Niger for assistance. However, Severus, in Pannonia, was closest to Rome, and reached the capital first with his troops. Julianus was executed on June 1 on the orders of Severus, just two months after Pertinax was killed.

Pescennius Niger
Niger began 193 as the governor of Syria. Once the mobs started calling for his help, he became a rival to Severus, since Severus believed that he should have total power and loyalty from the people of the empire. Niger ended up proclaiming himself emperor, which further angered Severus. Niger had allies in the eastern part of the empire, so when Severus threatened him with troops, he gathered an army from his allies and fought Severus throughout the empire for two years. He eventually lost the civil war near the city of Issus.

Clodius Albinus

Clodius Albinus came into contention for the imperial office in 193, when he was asked to become emperor after the death of Commodus, but rejected the proposition. However, he did eventually gain the title of Caesar because Severus needed assistance in controlling the empire while he was fighting Niger, so that he could completely focus on the civil war.  Severus and Albinus were considered enemies at the time, but a treaty was signed between the two, which gave Albinus more power and the title of Caesar. Some sources say that this treaty was only honorary and only benefited Severus, who only won because of Albinus' support, while not actually giving away any of his power as emperor. Albinus controlled Britain, and this treaty would have given him power over Gaul and Spain. Most sources do not mention a formal treaty, but they do say that a more informal agreement existed between the two men, so that Severus could concentrate on Niger.  Albinus continued in this role as "Caesar" for three more years before a civil war broke out between them, resulting in Severus becoming the sole emperor.

Septimius Severus

Severus was, practically speaking, the emperor after Pertinax was assassinated. Some sources tie Severus and Pertinax together and call them allies, which would explain how Severus became so powerful during this chaotic year. Twelve days after the March 28 assassination, Severus made himself ruler with the Senate's backing. He had Didius Julianus executed and made enemies of the other powerful nobles who had a possibility of becoming emperor, i.e. Niger and Albinus. He had originally wanted to take the throne after Commodus' murder, but the haste with which the assassins named Pertinax emperor prevented that from happening. 

For the first few years of his reign, he was preoccupied with the civil war he was waging against Niger in the eastern half of the Roman Empire, so he shared the emperorship with Clodius Albinus. He even signed an agreement with Albinus to gain his support despite being his enemy, granting him the title of Caesar, but none of the real power. However, once he defeated Niger, he set his sights on Albinus and waged a successful civil war against him. After defeating both of his enemies, Severus also purged their followers to impress upon the people that he was the sole Caesar. The ascension of Severus to sole rule of the empire marks the beginning of the Severan dynasty.

See also 
Year of the Four Emperors (AD 69)
Year of the Six Emperors (AD 238)

References

Civil wars of the Roman Empire
2nd-century Roman emperors
190s in the Roman Empire
192
193
Severan dynasty
Wars of succession involving the states and peoples of Europe
Wars of succession involving the states and peoples of Africa
Wars of succession involving the states and peoples of Asia